Laurie Taylor may refer to:

 Laurie Taylor (sociologist) (born 1936), English sociologist and radio presenter
 Laurie Taylor (footballer, born 1916) (1916–1991), Australian rules footballer for South Melbourne, St Kilda and Hawthorn 
 Laurie Taylor (footballer, born 1918) (1918–1981), Australian rules footballer for Richmond, West Adelaide and Glenelg
 Laurie Taylor (skier) (born 1996), British alpine skier
 Rocky Taylor (Laurie Taylor, born 1946), British stuntman and actor

See also
Lawrence Taylor (disambiguation)
Larry Taylor (disambiguation)
Lauren Taylor (disambiguation)